William Coles may refer to:

 William Coles (MP) (1616–1697), English lawyer and politician
 William Coles (RAF officer) (1913–1979), Royal Air Force officer and British bobsledder
 William E. Coles Jr. (1932–2005), American novelist and professor.
 William Coles (botanist) or Cole (1626–1662), British botanist
 William Arthur Coles, physicist
 William Charles Coles (born 1965), United States Virgin Islands archer